Prairie View or Prairieview may refer to:

in the United States
(by state)
Prairie View, Boone County, Illinois
Prairie View, Lake County, Illinois
Prairie View, Kansas
Prairieview, Missouri, a ghost town in Warren County
Prairie View (Pleasant Green, Missouri), listed on the NRHP in Cooper County, Missouri
Prairie View, Texas
Prairie View A&M University
Prairie View A&M Panthers and Lady Panthers athletic teams representing the university
Prairie View, former name of Bridge City, Texas

in Canada
Prairie View, Saskatchewan